Leighann Lord is an American comedian, writer, and actress. She performs stand-up comedy, has appeared on Tough Crowd with Colin Quinn, and is a former co-host (with Neil deGrasse Tyson) of the Star Talk Radio podcast. As of April 2020, Lord became a co-host for Center for Inquiry's Point of Inquiry podcast. She is a fellow with the Committee for Skeptical Inquiry.

Early life and education
Leighann Lord was born in the South Jamaica neighborhood of Queens in New York City, and was raised by her West Indian parents. She attributes her interest in comedy to both her cultural heritage and to looking for a way to avoid being teased as a child. She reports "People started to laugh with me and not at me. I was an 11-year-old sixth-grader with a game plan that led me in the right direction." She attended Baruch College at the City University of New York where she studied journalism, creative writing and theater with an interest in show business; in 1989, she graduated magna cum laude with a BA in journalism and creative writing.

Career
After college, Lord worked for five years in corporate communications for Chemical Bank, but retained an interest in show business, and eventually started performing at stand-up comedy clubs.

She has performed stand-up on Lifetime's "Girls Night Out," HBO's "Def Comedy Jam" and Comedy Central's "Premium Blend", and she won the "Hilarious Housewives Contest" on ABC's "The View." She cites as comedic influences including George Carlin, Marsha Warfield, Carol Burnett and Bertice Berry.

In addition to performing her own material, Lord was a writer for The Chris Rock Show and writes the syndicated humor column "The Urban Erma".

In 2014, Lord published Dict Jokes: Alternate Definitions for Words You've Probably Never Heard of But Will Definitely Never Forget.

In February 2015, Lord featured on Star Talk Radio with Neil deGrasse Tyson in the episode "From Warp Drives to Cloaking Devices: Star Trek Cosmic Queries Sunday".

Lord is associated with African Americans for Humanism, which ran a 2012 media campaign including billboards depicting Lord and other contemporary activists and organizers alongside historically prominent African American humanists Zora Neale Hurston, Langston Hughes, and Frederick Douglass.

Lord was the emcee at the 2019 skeptical convention, CSICon, in Las Vegas, Nevada. She used her "light touch" to ask "provocative questions like 'What if Adam was made from Eve's rib?'"

As of 2022, Lord is a fellow with the Committee for Skeptical Inquiry.

Books
 Leighann Lord’s Big Book of Book Titles: When You Don’t Have Time to Read a Whole F**king Book
 Leighann Lord's Dict Jokes: ALTernate DEFinitions for Words You’ve Probably Never Heard of But Will Definitely Never Forget (2014)
 Leighann Lord's Dict Jokes: More ALTernate DEFinitions for Words You've Probably Never Heard of But Will Definitely Never Forget (2014)
 The Great Spanx Experiment: The Urban Erma's Best Humor Essays of 2011 (2014)
 I Wish Facebook Had a Hate Button: The Urban Erma's Best Humor Essays of 2012 (2014)
 Happy Black Men: The Urban Erma's Best Humor Essays of 2013 (2014)
 Real Women Do It Standing Up: Stories From the Career of a Very Funny Lady (2016)

Awards
Lord was voted "Most Thought Provoking Black Female Comic" at the 4th annual Black Comedy Awards. She was also nominated for Best Play and Best Director for her one-woman show The Full Swanky at the Riant Theatre Women's Play Festival.

Gallery

References

African-American female comedians
21st-century American comedians
African-American women writers
American women comedians
American people of West Indian descent
Living people
African-American atheists
American atheists
People from Jamaica, Queens
African-American writers
American skeptics
Year of birth missing (living people)
21st-century American women
21st-century African-American women
21st-century African-American people